Sport Club Internacional, commonly known as Internacional, was a Brazilian football team from São Paulo, São Paulo state. They competed several times in the Campeonato Paulista and won the competition twice.

History
Sport Club Internacional was founded on August 19, 1899. They won the Campeonato Paulista for the first time in 1907, and in 1928, when the league was organized by LAF. The club played 370 Campeonato Paulista games between 1902 and 1932. Internacional, due to financial difficulties, merged with Antarctica Futebol Clube in 1933, and the new club was named Clube Atlético Paulista.

Stadium
Internacional played their home games at Estádio da Floresta. The stadium had a maximum capacity of 2,000 people.

Achievements

 Campeonato Paulista:
 Winners (2): 1907, 1928
 Runners-up (2): 1906, 1929

References

Defunct football clubs in São Paulo (state)
Association football clubs established in 1899
Association football clubs disestablished in 1933
Football clubs in São Paulo
1899 establishments in Brazil
1933 disestablishments in Brazil